Mindrum is a village in Northumberland, England, in the district of Berwick-upon-Tweed. Now little more than a postal address, it forms the centre of a number of farms.

Geography
Mindrum is located on the North West Foothills of the Cheviot Hills on the Bowmont Water, one of the Tributaries of the River Tweed. Whilst the term Mountain may be optimistic, the village is flanked by a clear ridge running from Camp Hill to the Mindrum Mill Crag on its North West Flank.

Etymology
The name Mindrum, is thought to be of Cumbric origin. It can be explained as a compound of the words equivalent to Welsh , 'mountain' and drum, 'ridge'. Mindrum appears to have the same etymology as Mynydd y Drum, Wales. Whilst the term 'mountain' may be optimistic, the village is flanked by a clear ridge running from Camp Hill to the Mindrum Mill Crag on its North West Flank. Although the word "Min" in Welsh means an "edge". Thus an alternative, and perhaps more logical, etymology is "edge of the ridge".

Governance 
Mindrum is in the parliamentary constituency of Berwick-upon-Tweed.

References

External links

[1] - Mindrum Gardens
 http://www.crabtreeandcrabtree.com/Gamekeeper's_Cottage-propertyid:76849 - Holiday Cottages

Villages in Northumberland